Steve Jones (born 5 January 1960) is a British airline and aerobatics pilot who competed in the Red Bull Air Race World Series, flying a Zivko Edge 540. He is now the championship's head judge.

Jones had his first flying lesson at just five years old, in 1965, in a Cessna, on the knee of a family friend. He became a pilot both commercially and competitively.

Commercially, Jones was formerly a captain for British Airways, flying a Boeing 747. He spends his off-season working on and racing vintage cars. His company is also rebuilding two vintage wooden racing aircraft.

Since 1994, Jones has flown competitively and as a display pilot with Paul Bonhomme in their Red Bull Matadors Team. They have taken their show around the world from the UAE to Japan. Jones flies as the wingman. Jones was a competitive Red Bull Air Race pilot from the first UK race which took place in Kemble UK in 2004. In the Red Bull Air Race series of 2007, he won in Porto, Portugal, defeating Mike Mangold.

Jones retired from Airrace as a competitor at the end of the 2008 season. He spent the next two seasons as technical commentator for TV and Internet coverage. 

Red Bull Air Race took a 3-year break, returning in 2014. Jones came back as race director and head of training.  

Jones is not to be confused with Steve Jones, glider pilot, who was winner of the 2001 and 2014 World Gliding Championships.

1995	British Aerobatics Champion 
 1995	UK Freestyle Aerobatics Champion
 FAI WGP Championships – three 1st place medals, one 2nd place medal
 All FAI WGP results in the formation team category as the Sukhoi Duo/Matadors

Flying achievements 
 2000	FAI World Grand Prix, Gold Medal, Japan
 2001	FAI WGP, Silver, Japan
 2002	FAI WGP, Silver, Czech Republic; Gold, Japan
 2004	FAI WGP, Gold, U.A.E.
 2005	FAI WGP, Gold, Switzerland
 2005	FAI WGP, Bronze, U.A.E.; Gold, Switzerland

Legend:
 CAN: Cancelled
 DNP: Did not participate
 DNS: Did not show
 DQ: Disqualified
 NC: Not classified

See also
 Competition aerobatics

External links
Red Bull Air Race World Series website
Steve Jones website
Aerobatics maneuver and videos website

1960 births
Living people
British aviators
British air racers
Red Bull Air Race World Championship pilots
Aerobatic pilots
Commercial aviators